#Adulting is an American comedy-drama web series created by and starring Ben Baur and Thandi Tolmay. It follows two friends, Max and Faye, who are nearing 30 and have yet to put their lives in order.

After producing two episodes and launching them on YouTube, Baur and Tolmay funded the production of four more through a May 2016 Kickstarter crowdfunding campaign that raised nearly US $19,000.

Premise
Best friends Max and Faye are faced with the reality that they are nearly 30 years old and have no money, careers, or boyfriends.

Cast
 Ben Baur as Max
 Thandi Tolmay as Faye
 Peter Sudarso as Austin
 Michael Perl as George (season one)
 Aubrey Marquez as Eddie (season two)
 Keir Kirkegaard as David (season two)

Development and production
Ben Baur and Thandi Tolmay, who graduated from The American Musical and Dramatic Academy with series director TJ Marchbank, conceived #Adulting while celebrating Baur's 29th birthday. Baur said, "We came up with the idea for #Adulting because we wanted to tell stories that were tragically relatable to this really odd time in life, when you're supposed to be a grown-up  and you're just ... not." Baur is known for starring in the 2012–2015 web series Hunting Season, and in 2015 was named by Out to its Out100 list.

After two self-funded episodes launched on YouTube were well received by fans, Baur and Tolmay funded the production of four more through a May 2016 Kickstarter crowdfunding campaign that raised nearly US $19K. Guest stars include Drew Droege and David Del Rio. The new episodes premiered on October 7, 2016 at the Brooklyn Web Fest, and were later put on YouTube.

Episodes

Season one (2016)

Season two (2018)

Reception
Katrina Alonso of Out called #Adulting "hilariously awkward". Writing for Instinct, Adam Dupuis deemed the series "binge worthy".

Awards and nominations

References

External links

 
 
 

2016 web series debuts
2016 web series endings
American comedy web series
American drama web series
American LGBT-related web series
2010s YouTube series